Persoonia arborea, commonly known as tree geebung, is a species of large shrub or small tree that is endemic to Victoria, Australia.

Description

Taxonomy
Persoonia arborea was first formally described in 1865 by Ferdinand von Mueller in the fifth volume of Fragmenta Phytographiae Australiae, based on material he collected from the "headwaters of the La Trobe and Yarra Rivers".

Distribution and habitat
It is listed as "vulnerable" on the Department of Sustainability and Environment's Advisory List of Rare Or Threatened Plants In Victoria. However, within its limited range  it is relatively common, and is able to colonise disturbed areas. About 40% of its habitat lies within the Yarra Ranges National Park, while the remaining 60% occurs on public land utilised for logging.

References

arborea
Flora of Victoria (Australia)
Plants described in 1865
Taxa named by Ferdinand von Mueller